Templin station is a railway station in the municipality of Templin, located in the Uckermark district in Brandenburg, Germany.

References

Railway stations in Brandenburg
Buildings and structures in Uckermark (district)
Railway stations in Germany opened in 1888